Theodor Kramer (1 January 1897 – 3 April 1958) was an Austrian poet of Jewish origin. He was persecuted during the Second World War and fled to the United Kingdom. After his death his significant poetic output fell into obscurity, but has been rediscovered in recent decades. Several of his poems have been set to music.

Biography 
Theodor Kramer was born on 1 January 1897. His father was the village doctor of Niederhollabrunn in the Weinviertel region of Lower Austria. After completing his secondary education with the matura examination he served as an officer in the Austrian army until the end of the war. After the war, he began to study Germanic philology and governmental studies, but curtailed his university education to work as a civil servant and later a book retailer. From 1931 he earned his living by writing. His literary output, almost exclusively poetry, brought him significant success and he became well known in the German-speaking world.

After the Anschluss with Nazi Germany, Kramer – a Jew and Social Democrat – was forbidden to work. In 1939 he was able against all the odds to secure emigration to the United Kingdom, first for his wife and then for himself. From 1940 to 1941 he was imprisoned as an enemy alien. In 1943 he started work as a college librarian in Guildford. In 1946 he took British citizenship, and stayed in the same job until 1957. He was on the governing body of the Austrian PEN club, an association of persecuted writers. He was in close contact with other members of the club like Elias Canetti, Erich Fried and Hilde Spiel. In the 1950s he gradually withdrew from social contact and his health deteriorated. In 1957 he was recalled to Vienna, where he received an honorary pension. He died in Vienna on 3 April 1958 and was buried in the Vienna Central Cemetery (30B - 1- 2) in a grave of honour (a grave given to particularly significant citizens).

Kramer's work was soon forgotten. His lyrical yet unromantic poetry draws its power and poetic quality from its depiction of outsiders: members of the proletariat, tramps, craftsmen, servants and whores. Kramer wrote sensitive poetic portraits of people and landscapes. His literary influences were Georg Trakl and Bertolt Brecht. Kramer's oeuvre consists of 10,000 works, many of which remain unpublished.

Thomas Mann called him, "one of the greatest poets of the young generation," and Stefan Zweig and Carl Zuckmayer promoted his writing. Yet the eighteen years of his exile in the United Kingdom were sufficient to allow his work to fall into obscurity, at least amongst the general reading public.

From the end of the 1970s, the interpretations of his poetry by the German folk duo Zupfgeigenhansel contributed significantly to the rediscovery of Kramer. In recent years the Berlin singer Hans-Eckardt Wenzel has released two albums of Kramer's poems set to music, which has revived interest in the poet in the German-speaking world.

In her 1996 book, In der Falle, Nobel Prize-winning author Herta Müller analyzed Kramer's autobiographical poetry in the context of dictatorship.

Awards
 1958 Literaturpreis der Stadt Wien (a literature prize awarded by the city of Vienna)

The Theodor Kramer Prize of the Theodor Kramer Society is awarded to authors writing in a context of resistance or exile.

Works
This is a list of his works, in German.

Gesammelte Gedichte in drei Bänden. Erwin Chvojka Ed. 3 vols. Paul Zsolnay Verlag, Vienna 2005. 
Spätes Lied. Gedichte. Erwin Chvojka Ed. Europaverlag, Munich 1996. 
Lass still bei Dir mich liegen ... Love poems. Erwin Chvojka Ed. Paul Zsolnay Verlag, Vienna 2005. 
Der alte Zitherspieler. Portraits. Erwin Chvojka Ed. Club Niederösterreich, Vienna 1999. 
So lange der Atem uns trägt. Poems. Theodor Kramer-Gesellschaft, Vienna 2004. 
Herta Müller (Ed.): Die Wahrheit ist, man hat mir nichts getan. Poems. Paul Zsolnay, Vienna 1999.

References

Daniela Strigl: Wo niemand zuhaus ist, dort bin ich zuhaus. Theodor Kramer - Heimatdichter und Sozialdemokrat zwischen den Fronten. Böhlau Verlag 1993.  (German)
Harald Hahn, David Fuhr: Lob der Verzweiflung – Lieder und Texte zu Gedichten von Theodor Kramer.  Ibidem-Verlag 2006 (with CD).  (German)

External links
 
 Theodor Kramer Gesellschaft includes biography, bibliography and excerpts of his works .
 Ich leb' verstört dahin Article by Hannes Schwenger in Die Welt (in German).
 Kramerprogramm by Kellerman and Rieck with song lyrics and audio clips .
 Kramer-Lesung Biography and poems of Kramer .
 Theodor Kramer im  .
 Entry for Theodor Kramer at litkult1920er.aau.at, a project by the University of Klagenfurt
 

1897 births
1958 deaths
20th-century British poets
Jewish poets
20th-century Austrian poets
British male poets
Jewish emigrants from Austria to the United Kingdom after the Anschluss
People from Korneuburg District
Austrian male poets
Naturalised citizens of the United Kingdom
20th-century British male writers